Teemu Rautiainen (born March 13, 1992) is a Finnish professional ice hockey player who currently plays with the GCK Lions of the Swiss League (SL). He previously played with Ilves of the Finnish Liiga.

Rautiainen played with HPK in the SM-liiga during the 2010–11 season.

References

External links

1992 births
Living people
People from Nurmijärvi
Finnish ice hockey forwards
Ilves players
Sportspeople from Uusimaa